Women Won't Tell is a 1932 American Pre-Code drama film directed by Richard Thorpe and starring Sarah Padden, Otis Harlan and Gloria Shea. It was written by Lela E. Rogers, mother of Ginger Rogers.

Main cast
 Sarah Padden as Aggie Specks  
 Otis Harlan as Henry Jones  
 Gloria Shea as April Specks Moorehouse  
 Larry Kent as George Robinson  
 Edmund Breese as Attorney for the Defense  
 Mae Busch as Mrs. Ruth Howard 
 Walter Long as Joe Kummer  
 William V. Mong as Elias Moorehouse  
 Robert Ellis as District Attorney  
 Tom Ricketts as Williams  
 Isabel Withers as Wanda Wolf  
 John Hyams as Walter Robinson  
 Jane Darwell as Mrs. Walter Robinson  
 Dewey Robinson as Gregory Howard  
 Donald Kirke as Alvin Thompson  
 Charles Hill Mailes as Second Judge  
 Betty Mack as Liz

References

Bibliography
 Pitts, Michael R. Poverty Row Studios, 1929-1940. McFarland & Company, 2005.

External links
 

1932 films
1932 drama films
1930s English-language films
American drama films
Films directed by Richard Thorpe
American black-and-white films
Chesterfield Pictures films
1930s American films